James Abner "P. J." Locke III (born February 12, 1997) is an American football safety for the Denver Broncos of the National Football League (NFL). He played college football at Texas.

Early life 
Locke attended Central High School in Beaumont, Texas.

Professional career

Pittsburgh Steelers
Locke was signed by the Pittsburgh Steelers as an undrafted free agent following the 2019 NFL Draft on April 29, 2019. Locke was waived on August 31, 2019, during final roster cuts.

Denver Broncos
Locke was signed to the Denver Broncos' practice squad on December 17, 2019. He was waived during final roster cuts on September 5, 2020, and was signed to the practice squad the following day. He was elevated to the active roster on September 14 for the team's week 1 game against the Tennessee Titans, making his NFL debut, and reverted to the practice squad the next day. The Broncos promoted Locke to their active roster on September 24, 2020.

Locke established himself as a core special teamer since 2020, and led the Broncos in special teams snaps.

On March 16, 2023, Locke re-signed with the Broncos.

References

External links
Texas Longhorns bio
Denver Broncos bio

1997 births
Living people
American football safeties
Texas Longhorns football players
Denver Broncos players
Players of American football from Texas
Sportspeople from Beaumont, Texas